The Amityville Horror is a 1979 American supernatural horror film directed by Stuart Rosenberg. James Brolin and Margot Kidder star as a young couple who purchase a home haunted by combative supernatural forces. The film is based on Jay Anson's 1977 book The Amityville Horror and is the first entry in the Amityville Horror film series. A remake was produced in 2005.

The Amityville Horror was a major commercial success for American International Pictures, grossing over $80 million in the United States and going on to become one of the highest-grossing independent films of all time. It received mostly negative reviews from critics, though some film scholars have considered it a classic of the horror genre. The film was nominated for an Academy Award for Best Original Score by composer Lalo Schifrin and Kidder also earned a Saturn Award nomination for Best Actress.

Plot

In the early morning hours on November 13, 1974, Ronald DeFeo Jr. murders his entire family with a rifle at their home of 112 Ocean Avenue in Amityville, New York.

One year later, George and Kathy Lutz, a young married couple, move into the property. George appears not to be strong of faith, but Kathy is a Catholic in name at least. She has three children from her prior marriage: Greg, Matt, and Amy. The couple turn to Father Delaney to quickly bless the home, but Delaney encounters troubles in trying to do so, including a room full of flies, out of season; violent stomach sickness; and later, blisters on his palm when trying to make a phone call to Kathy at their home. The experience eventually stops when a door is opened and a voice demands Delaney leave the property. He rushes out of the house, but decides to continue helping the Lutz family. Delaney is later involved in a car accident resulting from mysterious malfunctions, and he becomes frustrated at the lack of support from his superiors in the diocese.

Kathy's aunt, a nun, comes by the house one afternoon but becomes violently ill. George begins to be more sullen and angry over perceived cold in the house, and obsesses with splitting logs and keeping the fireplace stoked. Before Kathy's brother's engagement party one night, $1,500 to be used for the caterer inexplicably goes missing in the house. Meanwhile, the babysitter watching Amy for the evening is locked inside a bedroom closet by an unseen force. Further unexplained incidents occur when one of the two boys suffers a crushed hand when a sash window falls on it, and Amy has an imaginary friend, Jody, who seems to be of a malevolent nature. Kathy catches a glimpse of two red, swine-like eyes outside the daughter's second-story bedroom window. Even the family dog, Harry, scratches obsessively (causing his paws to bleed) at a brick wall in the basement.

George's land surveying business begins to suffer with his lack of attendance, and his business partner, Jeff, grows concerned. Jeff's wife, Carolyn, very sensitive to the paranormal, is both repulsed and intrigued by the things she feels when at the house. While in the basement of the house, Carolyn begins demolishing a wall with a hammer, revealing a small room behind the wall.  Discovering the damage, George takes down the rest of the wall, observing a small room with red walls.  Carolyn, in terror, shrieks that they have found "the passage... to Hell!" – only her voice now sounds like Father Delaney's voice.

Back at the church, Father Delaney prays passionately to stop the evil in Amityville, but he is blinded and suffers a mental breakdown. He is next seen sitting in a garden in an unresponsive state, his mind completely gone.

Throughout the strange incidents, Kathy observes George's persistent waking up at 3:15 a.m., feeling he must go check on the boathouse. She also has nightmares, in which she is given details about the killings of the home's prior family. Research at the library and county records office suggest that the house is built atop a Shinnecock burial ground and that a known Satanic worshipper named John Ketchum had once lived on the land. She also discovers the news clippings about the DeFeo murders and notices Ronald DeFeo's striking resemblance to George.

The paranormal events culminate one stormy night. Blood oozes from the walls and down the staircase; Jody, appearing as a large, red-eyed pig, is seen through a window; and George attempts to kill the children with an axe, but regains his wits after Kathy disrupts him. After falling through the basement stairs into a pit of black sludge while rescuing Harry, George and the rest of the family drive away, abandoning their home and belongings. A final intertitle reads: "George and Kathleen Lutz and their family never reclaimed their house or their personal belongings. Today they live in another state."

Cast

Production

Development
Producer Samuel Z. Arkoff purchased the rights to the novel by Jay Anson, which was a commercial success upon its publication in 1977. Anson himself wrote a screenplay based on his work, but the script was rejected by Arkoff, and screenwriter Sandor Stern was assigned to write an entirely new script. Initially, the film had been conceived as a made-for-television film.

Casting

Brolin was hesitant when first offered the role of George Lutz. At the time of his casting, the script was unfinished, so Brolin obtained a copy of Anson's novel. Brolin read it until two o'clock in the morning. He had hung up a pair of his pants in the room earlier and during an especially tense passage of the book, the pants fell to the floor. Brolin jumped from his chair in fright. Convinced that the material would make an effective film, Brolin agreed to star. Kidder was cast in the role of Kathy Lutz after her breakthrough performance as Lois Lane in Superman the year prior.

Filming
The on-location scenes of The Amityville Horror were filmed at a private residence in Toms River, New Jersey, which had been converted to look like the 112 Ocean Avenue home after authorities in Amityville denied permission for filming. Exterior scenes were also filmed in Toms River and Point Pleasant Beach. Local police and ambulance workers played extras in the film, and the Toms River Volunteer Fire Company provided the rain during several scenes. Indoor shots were filmed at the MGM studio lot in Los Angeles, California.

The film shoot was widely publicized in national media when the studio attempted to concoct stories of "unusual" occurrences on the set (not dissimilar from what was claimed to have occurred during the filming of The Exorcist). According to Brolin, he and Kidder were both asked by the studio and the press, "'Is there weird stuff going on?'... and we were looking for stuff now. We'd have liked to tell them, 'Oh yeah, you wouldn't believe the stuff that happened yesterday—my lunch fell off the table in my lap.'"

Music

Lalo Schifrin's score for The Amityville Horror was nominated for an Academy Award for Best Original Score, but lost out to the score for A Little Romance by Georges Delerue. It is sometimes claimed that this score was the one rejected in 1973 for The Exorcist, but Schifrin has denied this in interviews.

Release
In promotion for the film's premiere, stars James Brolin and Margot Kidder visited the actual home at 112 Ocean Avenue, accompanied by the press. Brolin later reflected that the house was much more "condensed" than the location where the film was shot. Both Brolin and Kidder were skeptics of the claims made in the book. "I didn't buy that this really had happened," Kidder said in a 2005 interview. During the press junkets promoting the film, when asked whether she believed the Lutzes' claims, Kidder purportedly turned to the producers, who responded: "We'll never tell." In a 2005 interview, Margot Kidder said "the producers told us we should say all these terrible things happened on the set. It was all bullshit. Nothing happened, but it was funny."

The Amityville Horror had an invitational premiere at the Museum of Modern Art in New York on July 24 and was released in Los Angeles and New York on July 27, 1979.

Reception

Box office
The Amityville Horror premiered in the United States on July 27, 1979. It was one of the most successful films produced by an independent studio at the time and was the most profitable AIP release since The Born Losers (1968). The film opened in 748 theatres, grossing $7.8 million for the weekend. It grossed over $13.3 million for the week from 810 theatres, the second best opening week of the year (to that date) after Moonraker'''s $14.7 million and AIP's largest ever. It grossed a total of $86.4 million at the U.S. and Canadian box office, making it the second-highest-grossing film of 1979. It was the highest-grossing independent film of all time until 1990, when it was surpassed by Teenage Mutant Ninja Turtles.

Critical response
In his review at the time, Roger Ebert described the film as "dreary and terminally depressing". A staff review in People said Rod Steiger was overacting and that the film was "ridiculous." Tim Pulleine of the Monthly Film Bulletin declared that the film "proves the most satisfying excursion into no-frills spine-chilling for some time." and that "The film is constantly well played and provides Rod Steiger with his best opportunity in ages for all-stops-out bravura." John Simon of the National Review described The Amityville Horror as 'dreadful'.

In a retrospective review, historian James F. Broderick wrote: "Director Stuart Rosenberg crafted an effective horror movie that succeeds largely because the performers take the over-the-top material seriously... The film is taut, tense, and filled with the bizarre, unsettling events chronicled in the book." In a 2013 assessment, John Kenneth Muir called The Amityville Horror a "blunt and effective horror film" and discussed author Stephen King's analysis of the film's subtext of financial turmoil.  Muir wrote, "If one follows King's lead, it's easy to contextualize The Amityville Horror as a financial nightmare... Similarly, the movie's dialogue constantly references financial matters. "Bills have to be paid," says one character. "The IRS is calling," warns another. 'They'll nickel and dime you to death" is a mantra not just about the bill collectors, perhaps, but a warning about the demons in the house." On Rotten Tomatoes, 31% of 45 surveyed critics gave the film a positive review, and the average rating is 4.8/10. Its consensus reads, "Dull and disappointing, the best that can be said for The Amityville Horror is that it set a low bar for its many sequels and remakes".

Accolades

Legal disputes
The film resulted in several lawsuits.

Film franchise
 Amityville II: The Possession (1982)
 Amityville 3-D (1983)
 Amityville 4: The Evil Escapes (1989) 
 The Amityville Curse (1990) 
 Amityville: It's About Time (1992)
 Amityville: A New Generation (1993)
 Amityville Dollhouse (1996)
 The Amityville Horror (2005)
 Amityville: The Awakening (2017)
 The Amityville Murders'' (2018)

See also
 List of ghost films

Notes

References

Bibliography

External links
 
 
 
 

1979 films
1979 horror films
1979 independent films
1970s exploitation films
1970s ghost films
1970s police films
1970s psychological horror films
1970s supernatural horror films
1970s American films
American exploitation films
American ghost films
American haunted house films
American independent films
American International Pictures films
American police films
American psychological horror films
American supernatural horror films
Amityville Horror films
Demons in film
Fiction about familicide
Films about Catholic nuns
Films about Catholic priests
Films about domestic violence
Films about dysfunctional families
Films about imaginary friends
Films about lookalikes
Films about mass murder
Films about psychic powers
Films about remarriage
Films based on American horror novels
Films directed by Stuart Rosenberg
Films scored by Lalo Schifrin
Films set in 1974
Films set in 1975
Films set in Long Island
Films set in religious buildings and structures
Films shot in Connecticut
Films shot in New Jersey
Films shot in New York (state)
Films shot in Los Angeles
Horror films based on actual events
Religious horror films
1970s English-language films